William Bennett "Monk" Edwards (July 19, 1920 – May 19, 2009) was an American football offensive lineman in the National Football League for the New York Giants.  He played college football at Baylor University as a fullback from 1936 to 1939 and was drafted in the sixteenth round of the 1940 NFL Draft.

Career
Monk became a lawyer and served in the Federal Bureau of Investigation during World War II. He worked in the legal department for Gulf Oil from 1946 until he retired in 1976.

Honors
1972: Baylor Bears Hall-of-Fame inductee

References

1920 births
2009 deaths
People from Coryell County, Texas
American football offensive tackles
American football offensive guards
New York Giants players
Baylor Bears football players
Texas lawyers
Federal Bureau of Investigation agents
20th-century American lawyers